The Chișinău Independence Day Parade is one of the events of the Independence Day of Moldova held by the Moldovan National Army. The parade is held in Chișinău, Moldova on August 27 every 5 to 10 years on Great National Assembly Square.

History of Moldovan military parades

Before 1991 parades in the Moldavian Soviet Socialist Republic were held in honor of the October Revolution, Victory Day, and until 1969 May Day. In 1976, Chisinau hosted a parade in honor of the 50th anniversary of its integration into the Soviet Union, held in the presence of General Secretary Leonid Brezhnev and First Secretary Ivan Bodiul. The final military parade in the Moldovan SSR took place in 1989 in honor of the October Revolution, which was marred by protests that occurred in the capital. On the morning of 7 November, a group of 100 people from the Popular Front of Moldova took candles and stood in front of Soviet tanks preparing for the parade. As a result, the mobile column of the parade was interrupted and abruptly canceled by the ruling authorities, with the leaders of Communist Party of Moldova left the central stage immediately. Moldova would not hold another military parade until 2001.

Independence parades

2001
In 2001, Moldova celebrated the 10th anniversary of independence. It was the first parade since the fall of the USSR and was ordered by President Vladimir Voronin in early July.

2011
2011 celebrated the 20th anniversary of independence. Acting President Marian Lupu, who signed the order for the parade that April delivered the holiday address during the parade. Inspecting the parade from a GAZ-24 cabriolet parade car was the Minister of Defense of Moldova Vitalie Marinuța while the officer commanding the parade was Brigadier General Vitalie Stoian from the National Army's General Staff. Dress rehearsals took place three, seven and ten days before the parade, with the first rehearsal on August being attended by Prime Minister of Moldova Vlad Filat. It was the first time military equipment had been brought to the central square sine 1989. At the head of the parade were the flag of Moldova, as well as the military banners of the Emperor Stefan the Great, which were brought to Chisinau from Romania as a gesture on their part. The contingent of veterans of the Transnistrian War was led by Division General Ion Costaș, a former Minister of Interior (1990–1992) and Defence (1992). A new, more western style marching formula was used for the parade as well as new military uniforms were used during the parade.

2016
2016 celebrated the silver jubilee of Moldovan independence. It was the first to use a revised format that was similar to the Great Union Day Parade in Bucharest. The following 6 foreign contingents took part in the parade for the first time: Odessa Military Academy (Ukraine), the Michael the Brave 30th Guards Brigade and the Asociatia Traditia Militara contingent (Romania), the Representative Honor Guard Battalion of the Polish Armed Forces (Poland), the Grand Duke Gediminas Staff Battalion (Lithuania), and a 4-man group from the Royal Irish Regiment (United Kingdom). Servicemen of the Russian Armed Forces were also invited to the parade. More than 2,000 soldiers, as well as veterans of the army marched in the parade. The commander of the parade was the Chief of the General Staff of the Moldovan Armed Forces, Brigadier General Igor Cutie. During the 2016 parade, Moldovan police fired tear gas to disperse anti-government protesters who were participating in the 2015–16 protests. Opposition parties previously had called for rallies to disrupt the military parade, launching an "I'm not afraid" campaign on social media. Opposition lawyer Anna Ursaki said the following in favor of protests: "If the authorities have the right to organize parades, to have a feast during the plague, when people are miserable, we have the right to protests".

2021
2021 marked the 30th anniversary of independence. The action plan for the parade was approved by the government in June and President Maia Sandu signed the corresponding decree on July 23. It costed 2 million Moldovan leu. 1,200 participants (800 from the National Army and 420 from the security services) took part in the parade, which took place within a framework to stop the spread of the COVID-19 pandemic in Moldova. The parade was led by Brigadier General Igor Gorgan, with Cristian Tabîrţa serving as chief standard bearer.

The following dignitaries were in attendance:
Moldovan President Maia Sandu
Moldovan Prime Minister Natalia Gavrilița
President of the Moldovan Parliament Igor Grosu
Moldovan Defence Minister Anatolie Nosatîi
Romanian President Klaus Iohannis (who arrived in time for the start of the march past)
Romanian Defence Minister Nicolae Ciucă
Polish President Andrzej Duda
Ukrainian President Volodymyr Zelensky
Ukrainian Prime Minister Denys Shmyhal

Parade composition
The parade has the following general composition:

Veterans of the Transnistria War and the Soviet-Afghan War
Officers of the National Army
Alexandru cel Bun Military Academy
Infantry of the National Army
1st Motorized Infantry Brigade "Moldova"
2nd Motorized Infantry Brigade "Stefan Cel Mare"
3rd Motorized Infantry Brigade "Dacia"
22nd Peacekeeping Battalion
Forces of the Ministry of Internal Affairs
Ştefan cel Mare Police Academy
Special Forces Brigade "Fulger"
Officers of the General Police Inspectorate
Inspectorate General of the Trupele de Carabinieri
Moldovan Border Police
Civil Protection and Emergency Situations Service
Honor Guard Company of the National Army

Military bands in attendance

The military bands of the Chisinau Garrison who take part in the parade are composed of:
 
 The Presidential Orchestra of the Republic of Moldova
 The Band of the 1st Motorized Infantry Brigade
 The Band of the 2nd Motorized Infantry Brigade
 The Band of the 3rd Motorized Infantry Brigade
 Band of the Alexandru cel Bun Military Academy
 Band of the Department of Carabinier Troops
 Central Band of the Border Police

Photos of the parade

See also 
 Kyiv Independence Day Parade
 Minsk Independence Day Parade

References

External links 
 2001 Chișinău Independence Day Parade.
 2011 Chișinău Independence Day Parade.
 "Limba noastră" performed here by the Presidential Band of the Republic of Moldova in the 2011 Chișinău Independence Day Parade.
 2016 Chișinău Independence Day Parade.

Military parades
Events in Moldova
Chișinău
Summer events in Moldova
Military of Moldova